Ubon UMT Stadium is a football stadium in Ubon Ratchathani, Thailand. The stadium was the home stadium of Ubon UMT United F.C. of Thai League 1 starting from 2017. The stadium has located in The Eastern University of Management and Technology (UMT) where it gains the name. It holds 6,000 people in the first phase and could be expanded later  to 10,000.

References

Football venues in Thailand
Buildings and structures in Ubon Ratchathani province